Niquinohomo FC is a Nicaraguan football club from Niquinohomo, Masaya Department. It was founded on 2000 and currently plays on Tercera División de Nicaragua.

References 
Club profile on StatisticSports

Football clubs in Nicaragua
Association football clubs established in 2000